William Lawrence Twining  (born 22 September 1934) is the Emeritus Quain Professor of Jurisprudence at University College London, having held the post until 1996. He is a leading member of the Law in Context movement, and has contributed especially to jurisprudence, evidence and proof, legal method, legal education, and intellectual history. He has focused recently on "globalization" and legal theory.

Central themes of Twining's contributions to legal matters include the variety and complexity of legal phenomena; the proposition that many so-called “global” processes and patterns are sub-global, linked to empires, diasporas, alliances, and legal traditions; that diffusion, legal pluralism, and surface law are important topics for both analytical and empirical jurisprudence; that, in a world characterized by profound diversity of beliefs and radical poverty, the discipline of law needs to engage with problems of constructing just and workable supra-national institutions and practices; and that adopting a global perspective challenges some of the main working assumptions of Western traditions of academic law.

At the start of his career, Twining taught for seven years in Sudan and Tanzania. He has maintained an interest in Eastern Africa, and more broadly the Commonwealth. He has studied and taught in several leading UK and American law schools as well.  Twining is currently a visiting faculty member at the University of Miami School of Law.

Twining has held chairs in Belfast and Warwick.

Publications 
 Twining, William (2009) General Jurisprudence: Understanding Law from a Global Perspective, Cambridge University Press
 Twining, William (2009) Human Rights: Southern Voices (ed.) Cambridge University Press
 Twining, William (2010) How To Do Things With Rules (with David Miers, 4th edn., 1999; 5th edn forthcoming 2010)
 Twining, William (2009) “Implications of globalisation for law as a discipline” in A.Halpin and V. Roeben (eds.) Theorising the Global Order
 “Social Science and Diffusion of Law” Jo. Law and Society, 32: 203-40 (2005)
 “The Hutton Inquiry: Some Wider Legal Aspects” in W. G. Runciman (ed.) Hutton and Butler: Lifting the Lid on the Workings of Power (British Academy/ Oxford University Press, 2004)
 The Great Juristic Bazaar: Jurists' Texts and Lawyers' Stories (Ashgate, 2003)
 Globalisation and Legal Theory (2000)
 Karl Llewellyn and the Realist Movement (1973, 1985)
 Analysis of Evidence (2nd edition, with Terence Anderson and David Schum. Cambridge: Cambridge University Press, 2005)
 Rethinking Evidence (2nd edition, 2006)
 Evidence and Inference in History and Law (ed. with Iain Hampsher-Monk, Northwestern UP, 2003)
 Legal education and legal scholarship
 “The Role of Academics in the Legal System” (UK) in P. Cane and M. Tushnet (eds) Oxford Handbook of Legal Studies (OUP,2003) pp. 920–29.
 Law in Context: Enlarging a Discipline (1997)
 Blackstone's Tower: The English Law School, 1994 Hamlyn Lectures.

References

External links
 Twining's page at UCL

Academics of University College London
1934 births
Living people
Philosophers of law